Synchiropus bartelsi, the Bartel's dragonet, is a species of fish in the family Callionymidae, the dragonets. It is found in the Western Central Pacific from Philippines to southern Indonesia.

Etymology
The fish bears the name of German biologist Harald Bartels, who is from Braunschweig.

References

bartelsi
Fish of the Pacific Ocean
Fish of East Asia
Taxa named by Ronald Fricke
Fish described in 1981